Hantaan orthohantavirus (HTNV) is an enveloped, single-stranded, negative-sense RNA virus species of Old World Orthohantavirus. It is the causative agent of Korean hemorrhagic fever in humans.  It is named for the Hantan River in South Korea, and in turn lends the name to its genus Orthohantavirus and family Hantaviridae.

Natural reservoir 
Apodemus agrarius, also known as striped field mouse, is the etiological vector of Hantaan orthohantavirus.

Transmission 
Transmission is believed to be through inhalation of aerosolized rodent urine and feces.

Morbidity and mortality 
In hantavirus induced hemorrhagic fever, incubation time is between two and four weeks in humans before symptoms of infection present. Severity of symptoms depends on the viral load. Like Dobrava-Belgrade virus, Hantaan virus has a mortality rate of 10 to 12%.

History 
During the Korean War (1951–1953), more than 3000 American and Korean troops fell ill with kidney failure, bleeding, and shock. The cause remained unknown until 1976 when Karl M. Johnson an American tropical virologist and his colleagues, including Korean virologist, Ho Wang Lee (Lee Ho Wang), isolated Hantaan virus from the lungs of striped field mice.

See also 
 Dobrava-Belgrade virus
 Sangassou virus
 Sweating sickness
 Hantavirus vaccine

References

External links 
Sloan Science and Film / Short Films / Muerto Canyon by Jen Peel 29 minutes
"Hantaviruses, with emphasis on Four Corners Hantavirus" by Brian Hjelle, M.D., Department of Pathology, School of Medicine, University of New Mexico
 CDC's Hantavirus Technical Information Index page
 Viralzone: Hantavirus
 Virus Pathogen Database and Analysis Resource (ViPR): Bunyaviridae
 Occurrences and deaths in North and South America

Viral diseases
Hantaviridae
Hemorrhagic fevers
Rodent-carried diseases